The Overland is an Australian passenger train service between the state capitals of Melbourne and Adelaide, a distance of 828 km (515 mi). It first ran in 1887 as the Adelaide Express, known by South Australians as the Melbourne Express. It was given its current name in 1926. Now operated by private company Journey Beyond, the train undertakes two return trips a week. Originally an overnight train that stopped at large intermediate stations, it now operates during the day, stopping less frequently. The Overland was converted to standard gauge in the 1990s and now operates from Melbourne over the longer standard gauge line initially heading south to the port city of Geelong, before returning to its original route in Ararat. After departing Ararat the train stops in the Victorian towns of Stawell, Horsham, Dimboola and Nhill before crossing the South Australian border. The final stretch into Adelaide, after crossing the Murray River is over the scenic Adelaide Hills. The train contains Red Premium and Red seated accommodation and a bar/lounge car, Café 828.

History

Early history
The Overland originated as the Intercolonial Express when the Victorian Railways' Western line was extended to join the South Australian Railways line at Serviceton on the state border. As both railways were  broad gauge, a through service commenced on 19 January 1887 using jointly owned rolling stock. The train was later called the Adelaide Express (westbound), or the Melbourne Express (eastbound) and ran a daily overnight service in each direction, with opulent Mann Boudoir sleeping cars. From 1907, new E type side corridor sitting and sleeping cars of Victorian Railways design were introduced. More cars of these designs were added until 1923, and in 1928 two all-steel sleeping cars and a dining car were imported from Pullman Company in the United States, these being the heaviest carriages ever used in Australia.

A dining car was included between Melbourne and Ararat from 1927, and between Adelaide and Serviceton from 1928, but with the onset of the Depression in 1930 these services were withdrawn until the mid-1930s, and finally ceased after the outbreak of World War II. The South Australian Railways purchased 500 and 600 class locomotives to haul the heavier train in South Australia. These were the largest locomotives in Australia at that time. In 1936 the train was renamed The Overland, and the original deep red livery was replaced by green and yellow with black horizontal lining. The SAR streamlined some of its 500 class locomotives for the makeover. In 1941 Victorian steam locomotive H220 was introduced to service, intended to haul the train but never entered regular service due to weight restrictions. For over 40 years Victorian Railways used A2 class locomotives, usually in pairs.

Post-war history

In 1946, a new style of sleeping compartment was being tested, and a mock-up of part of a carriage was built for display in Melbourne and Adelaide. The carriage portion was externally painted in green and black with yellow. The sleeping cars were of two types. Twinette cars had two-berth compartments (as had the E and Mann cars before them), but each compartment had an adjoining toilet and shower room; roomette cars had single-berth compartments either side of a central aisle, and a shower room at the end of the car. The maroon sleeping cars from 1949 onwards were 16 in number, later 18, and were given Aboriginal names that were painted on the sides of the cars. The eight roomette cars were Allambi, Chalaki, Juki, Mururi, Nankuri, Purpawi, Tantini, and Tarkinji; the ten twinette cars Dorai, Kuldalai, Malkari, Mokai, Nomuldi, Paiti, Tawarri, Weroni, Yankai, and Yanni. From 1949 the train moved into the modern era, with new air-conditioned Corten steel carriages gradually entering service, in maroon with a fluted stainless steel panel on each side and a black roof. This livery remained until the 1990s.

On 7 September 1951, the westbound service collided with the eastbound service at Serviceton station with four A2 class locomotives destroyed and one fatality. Diesel locomotives took over in 1953, with the introduction of the South Australian 900 class and Victorian B class. The superior acceleration of the latter allowed 70 minutes to be shaved off the journey time without exceeding the 60 mp/h limit. These were superseded by the 930, S, X and N class locomotives.

Twinette cars Tawarri and Yankai were added in 1967, and these also followed the newer style of interior. Thus from the early 1970s onwards in the newer style there were two roomette cars, Allambi and Tantini, four twinette cars, Dorai, Tawarri, Weroni, and Yankai. In 1971, roomette cars Allambi and Tantini and twinette cars Dorai and Weroni were sold to the Victorian Railways for use on The Vinelander to Mildura, and replaced with new carriages. They were repainted dark blue and their names removed; these names were then applied to the same type of new cars built to replace them. The interiors of these new cars were of a more modern design than the older cars. The roomette cars had a zigzag corridor instead of a straight one, and the compartments had the shape of a trapezium. This enabled the use of the toilet and washbasin units while the bed was still down, not possible in the older roomettes.

In 1975, Australian National took over the South Australian Railways and became joint operator of the train with the Victorian Railways.  From 18 May 1984, the Adelaide terminus was changed from Adelaide station to Keswick Terminal in Adelaide's Park Lands. A snapshot of the service in November 1990 included a car carrier (AMBP), two sleepers, a club car, another two sleepers, a first, second/buffet and second sitting cars and a luggage van, hauled by two N class locomotives. In holiday seasons the train was regularly built up to 16 carriages. From 1994, the train was operated solely by Australian National. At this time the Melbourne to Adelaide line was converted to standard gauge, and a new route via Maroona and Geelong introduced. The final broad-gauge services ran on 1 March 1995. Australian National began operating their CLP class locomotives on the service upon reintroduction of the service on standard gauge.

Motorail service
A motorail service was added to the train from November 1979. The service was withdrawn in the early 2000s when the vehicle loading ramp at the Melbourne end was removed as part of the Southern Cross station redevelopment, It was restored in February 2009, but was withdrawn again in November 2015.

Great Southern Rail

In November 1997, Australian National was sold and the passenger cars passed to Great Southern Rail Limited, which contracted National Rail to haul the services with NR class locomotives. On occasions, BL and 93 class locomotives hauled the service. In July 1998, the Wednesday and Saturday night journeys in each direction were cancelled, leaving the service operating five times per week in each direction. In May 1999, a new timetable was introduced but with previous intermediate stops omitted at Stawell, Murtoa, Nhill, Kaniva, Wolseley, Tintinara, Coonalpyn and Tailem Bend. In 1999, the maroon and silver livery was removed and the train was repainted in a new grey and silver scheme, with a new kookaburra logo. In May 2000, the service was reduced to four times weekly. However, with an accelerated journey time of 10 hours 30 minutes, the service was able to be operated by one set of passenger cars, operating to Melbourne in the day and to Adelaide overnight. Some of the largest Overland consists were run during this era; during the 2002 AFL finals, in which both the Adelaide Crows and Port Adelaide Power were competing, The Overland was built up to a record 32 carriages for the Preliminary Final round on 21 September.

In May 2007, Great Southern Rail re-timetabled the service to operate three times weekly in daylight after the passenger cars had been overhauled with a new blue, purple and green livery applied and interiors renewed. A new running emu logo was also introduced. From August 2008, 12 seats per train were made available to passengers within Victoria at V/Line fares. In October 2010, it was announced that the train would stop at Stawell. At the same time, the number of seats available on V/Line fares was increased to 64 per train. In August 2013, the three-times weekly service was reduced to twice-weekly.

From 2007, The Overland continued to operate with a $1.5 million annual subsidy from the Victorian State Government. In August 2015, concerns were raised about the future of the service when GSR announced that, because the Federal Government's subsidy of the fares of pensioners, veterans and seniors taking train journeys would end in July 2016, services on GSR's other trains, The Ghan and the Indian Pacific, were to be halved. Later in the month, the South Australian Government announced that it would support the service as part of a $1 million deal with the company.

Private equity era

From 2015, ownership of Great Southern Rail passed through a series of private equity funds, first to Allegro Funds in May 2015, then Quadrant Private Equity in October 2016 (at which time it was rebranded to "Journey Beyond"), and subsequently to US-based Hornblower Group in January 2022. The move to private equity ownership began a market pivot from being primarily a transport operator, to a luxury "experiential travel" operator. From July 2016, following the withdrawal of a federal subsidy, all coach-class seating was removed from The Ghan and the Indian Pacific, with these services now focusing on the premium market. The shorter travel time of The Overland was not conducive to such a conversion, so it was retained, but now conspicuously at variance with Journey Beyond's new tourism focus.

In 2018, The Overland's future was in doubt as 20 years of subsidies from the two state governments appeared likely to cease: although the Victorian Government renewed its subsidy for 15 months in August, the South Australian Government announced in November that it had decided not to renew its subsidy beyond the end of the year. In December, however, the Victorian Government announced it would fund the shortfall to allow the service to continue in 2019. The service was again threatened with withdrawal in December 2019 before a last-minute agreement for the Victorian government subsidy to continue until March 2020 was reached. In that month, the COVID-19 pandemic necessitated all "Journey Beyond" train services to be suspended, restarting in September 2020. In June 2020, the Victorian Government committed to a three-year funding agreement to support The Overland, providing $3.8 million per year until June 2023. After the 2022 South Australian state election, the victorious Labor Party reinstated the South Australian government's subsidy, coming to $1.4 million over four years.

Overland exhibits in museums
The National Railway Museum at Port Adelaide, South Australia, has several exhibits related to the train:
 1923-vintage wooden sitting car, 42BE
 sleeping car, Allambi, the first of the post-war steel cars built at Islington Railway Workshops
 12-wheel brakevan, 276, one of a type used on second divisions of the express during the Second World War 
 steam locomotive 504, named Tom Barr Smith 
 diesel-electric locomotive 900, named Lady Norrie.  

The Overland Museum, in Kaniva, on the Western Highway, Victoria, is dedicated exclusively to The Overland; its centrepieces are preserved sleeping cars Nomuldi and Pekina

See also
Detailed information, including drawings of Overland cars: VictorianRailaways.net

Note

References

External links

Interstate rail in Australia
Named passenger trains of Victoria (Australia)
Night trains of Australia
Railway services introduced in 1887
Rail transport in South Australia
1887 establishments in Australia
Motorail
Public transport routes in the City of Melbourne (LGA)